Jorge Jordi Arnau Creus (born 7 April 1970 in Terrassa, Catalonia) is a former field hockey player from Spain who won the silver medal with the men's national team at the 1996 Summer Olympics in Atlanta, Georgia.

References
Spanish Olympic Committee

External links
 

1970 births
Living people
Spanish male field hockey players
Field hockey players from Catalonia
Sportspeople from Terrassa
Olympic field hockey players of Spain
Olympic silver medalists for Spain
Field hockey players at the 1996 Summer Olympics
1998 Men's Hockey World Cup players
Olympic medalists in field hockey
Medalists at the 1996 Summer Olympics
Atlètic Terrassa players
20th-century Spanish people